The first Finnish Universal Exhibition was held in Helsinki in 1876.
the exhibition had been suggested in 1868, but was impacted by the great famine.

The fair was held at Kaivopuisto Park, led by J.V.Snellman and Theodor Höijeriltä was an architect.

Exhibits

The 1679 exhibitors included one showing a Finnish Steam Locomotive Class A5.

Visitors
Alexander II of Russia, Alexander III of Russia, Maria Alexandrova and Maria Feodorovna visited 2 weeks after the fair opened. 93000 tickets were redeemed.

See also
 Second International Aeronautic Exhibition

References

1876 in Finland
19th century in Helsinki
Grand Duchy of Finland
World's fairs in Finland